Blair Mastbaum is an American writer and a former model who lives in Brooklyn, New York.

Career
Mastbaum acted in and produced the 2005 Sundance Film Festival official competition film, Ellie Parker, directed by his partner, Scott Coffey. He co-wrote the 2018 feature film, For Real, also directed by Coffey.

Novels

Clay's Way
Mastbaum's first novel, 2004's Clay's Way, won a Lambda Literary Award.

Us Ones In Between
Mastbaum's second novel, Us Ones In Between, published by Running Press and released in May 2008, centers on depressed art school graduate Kurt Smith, who fantasizes about pushing boys in front of subway trains. The title is taken from the song "Us Ones In Between," written by Spencer Krug and performed by the band Sunset Rubdown. The novel was a finalist for the 2008 Ferro-Grumley Award.

Other works
Mastbaum edited the anthology Cool Thing: The Best New Gay Fiction by Young American Writers, released by Running Press on November 10, 2008.

References

External links
 Official site

Living people
21st-century American novelists
American male novelists
Lambda Literary Award for Debut Fiction winners
Writers from Portland, Oregon
1979 births
American gay writers
American LGBT novelists
Writers from Dayton, Ohio
21st-century American male writers
Novelists from Ohio
Novelists from Oregon
21st-century LGBT people